Tobyhanna Creek is a  tributary of the Lehigh River in the Pocono Mountains of eastern Pennsylvania in the United States.

The upper reaches of the creek pass through or near Tobyhanna Township, Tobyhanna Army Depot and Tobyhanna State Park.

Tunkhannock Creek joins Tobyhanna Creek near Blakeslee in Monroe County.

See also
List of rivers of Pennsylvania

References

External links
Tobyhanna Army Depot
Tobyhanna State Park
Tobyhanna Township
U.S. Geological Survey: PA stream gaging stations

Tributaries of the Lehigh River
Rivers of Pennsylvania
Pocono Mountains
Rivers of Monroe County, Pennsylvania